Let the Right One In is an American horror drama television series developed by Andrew Hinderaker, inspired by the novel of the same name by Swedish writer John Ajvide Lindqvist. The series stars Demián Bichir, Anika Noni Rose, Grace Gummer, Madison Taylor Baez, Ian Foreman, Nick Stahl, Jacob Buster and Kevin Carroll. It diverges and expands from the source material, focusing on a father who cares for his daughter after she becomes a vampire. It premiered on Showtime on October 9, 2022. It received generally positive reviews from critics, who praised the actors, but felt it was inferior to the original 2008 film adaptation.

In January 2023, the series was canceled after one season.

Premise
Mark Kane is a single father who has been protecting his daughter Eleanor after she turned into a vampire ten years prior; she has been stuck in the age of 12 ever since. Hoping to find a cure, together they've been hiding and running across the country, until he finally decides to reside them in New York City. Meanwhile, Eleanor meets and bonds with a 12 year old boy, Isiah Cole, as a scientist, Claire Logan, is brought in by her father to help find the cure for her brother's vampirism.

Cast and characters

Main
 Demián Bichir as Mark Kane
 Anika Noni Rose as Naomi Cole
 Grace Gummer as Claire Logan
 Madison Taylor Baez as Eleanor Kane
 Ian Foreman as Isaiah Cole
 Nick Stahl as Matthew Dean
 Jacob Buster as Peter Logan
 Kevin Carroll as Zeke Dawes

Recurring
 Željko Ivanek as Arthur Logan
 Fernanda Andrade as Elizabeth Kane 
 Jimmie Saito as Ben Jones
 Josh Wingate as Roland
 Caroline Neff as Danielle Wilson

Guest
 Ato Essandoh as Frank

Episodes

Production

Development
A television adaptation based on the 2004 novel, Let the Right One In, by John Ajvide Lindqvist was in development for A&E. On August 29, 2016, the pilot was now in development at TNT as an eerie drama following the same premise as its predecessor. On April 13, 2017, TNT announced they had scrapped the pilot and were shopping the series to other networks in its current iteration or a potential redo.

On March 15, 2021, Showtime ordered a pilot for the series, with Andrew Hinderaker serving as showrunner. On September 22, 2021, the show was ordered as a 10-episode series.

In an October 2022 interview, Ajvide Lindqvist mentioned he was not involved with the show, explaining that he inadvertently sold all rights to the book for only 1 SEK when he thought he was only giving Hammer Films the rights to make Let Me In (2010), the American remake of the 2008 film adaptation of the book, meaning he will earn no royalties from the TV show; according to him, Hammer had misled him of the nature of the contract, saying "there were thick bundles of American legal prose. And that would then mean that I sold all the rights for a penny, but that was just a mere formality and would have no practical meaning, they said." On January 30, 2023, Showtime canceled the series after one season.

Casting
Kristine Froseth was cast in the TNT iteration of the pilot as the lead, Eli, on September 29, 2016. On October 13, 2016, Benjamin Wadsworth and Thomas Kretschmann were tapped to star as the other leads, Henry and Inspector Eriksson, respectively. On October 20, 2016, Necar Zadegan and Cameron Gellman joined the pilot in the series regular role FBI Special Agent Sarah Church, and the recurring role of Kyle, respectively. Darren Mann joined the pilot in a recurring role as Lukas on October 25, 2016. The pilot at TNT was eventually scrapped in April 2017 before entering production.

On March 15, 2021, Demian Bichir signed onto the pilot as the lead, now in development at Showtime. Anika Noni Rose joined the main cast as Naomi on April 15, 2021. Grace Gummer joined the main cast as Claire on April 29, 2021. Nick Stahl was cast as a series regular as Matthew on January 26, 2022. On June 17, 2021, Madison Taylor Baez was cast in the lead opposite Demián Bichir as Eleanor. Kevin Carroll, Jacob Buster and Ian Foreman were also amongst the new cast additions. Željko Ivanek & Fernanda Andrade joined the series in recastings as Elizabeth and Arthur, respectively. Larry Pine and Susan Santiago played their respective roles in the pilot. Jimmie Saito, Josh Wingate, and Caroline Neff joined the series in recurring roles as Ben, Roland, and Danielle Wilson, respectively.

Filming
Principal photography for the pilot began on May 31, 2021, in New York City. The series entered production in early 2022.

Reception

Critical response
The review aggregator website Rotten Tomatoes reported a 63% approval rating with an average rating of 6.3/10, based on 27 critic reviews. The website's critics consensus reads, "Let the Right One In doesn't hold a candle to the cinematic original, but viewers who invite this vampiric chronicle into their homes and television screens will be rewarded with compelling performances." Metacritic, which uses a weighted average, assigned a score of 63 out of 100 based on 18 critics, indicating "generally favorable reviews".

Ratings

References

External links
 
 

2020s American drama television series
2020s American horror television series
2022 American television series debuts
2022 American television series endings
Horror drama television series
English-language television shows
Psychological horror
Psychological drama television and other works
Showtime (TV network) original programming
Television series by CBS Studios
Television series set in the 2020s
Television shows based on Swedish novels
Vampires in television
Television shows filmed in New York City
Television shows set in New York City